Linnea Ceder (born 8 August 2002) is a Finnish figure skater. At the 2020 European Championships, she qualified to the final segment and finished 12th overall. She is the 2022 Finnish national silver medalist.

Programs

Competitive highlights 
GP: Grand Prix; CS: Challenger Series; JGP: Junior Grand Prix

Detailed results

Senior

Junior

References

External links 
 

2002 births
Finnish female single skaters
Living people
People from Tuusula
Sportspeople from Uusimaa
21st-century Finnish women